Dharma Durai is a 1991 Indian Tamil-language action drama film directed by Rajasekhar and written by Panchu Arunachalam. A remake of the 1989 Kannada film Deva, it stars Rajinikanth and Gautami, with Madhu, Charan Raj, Nizhalgal Ravi and Vaishnavi in supporting roles. The film revolves around the title character seeking revenge on his younger brothers for taking advantage of his innocence.

Rajasekhar initially began work on a film titled Kaalam Maaripochu with Rajinikanth starring, but the project was dropped, with the same crew instead deciding to remake Deva. The film was released on 14 January 1991, and emerged a major success, running for over 175 days in theatres. It was the last film directed by Rajasekhar, who died 100 days after its release.

Plot 
The story begins with a young couple, Balu and Ishwarya, being chased by some goons. Ishwarya is the daughter of Rajadorai and had eloped with her boyfriend Balu against the wishes of Rajadorai. Rajadorai sends his goons to track down the couple. When the goons finally track down the couple in a forest and start beating up Balu, a man comes to the couple's rescue. When Rajadorai and his brother Ramadorai find out about this man, they rush over to his hideout in the forest, only to escape in fear when they see him. The couple is scared and puzzled as to how the man could induce so much fear in the brothers. The man's wife Parvathi then tells the couple the story of the man, whose name is Dharmadorai.

Dharmadorai was a farmer in the village Valliyur. He was the elder brother of Rajadorai and Ramadorai. He had showered so much love and affection on his younger brothers and even borrowed  30,000 for their "education", much against his father's wishes, who fully knew that his younger sons were crooked and evil. He even got Rajadorai married to Vaibhavi, a girl whom Rajadorai had raped, to save him from a jail term. The brothers however, showed no sort of affection for Dharmadorai and used his innocence for their sinister desires. Rajadorai convinced Dharmadorai to borrow  6 lakhs so that he could "start a business". Using this money, Rajadorai and Ramadorai moved to Madras and went into smuggling. They later double-crossed their smuggler boss Jose by keeping all the items meant to be smuggled and also lodging a police complaint against his son Ajay for their own benefit and soon became rich due to their illegal activities.

One day, Dharmadorai went to Madras when he heard that Ramadorai was going to get engaged to a rich girl and leave with her for the United States to "pursue higher studies". The brothers did not receive him warmly and humiliated him that evening at a farewell party organised for Ramadorai. Later that night, Ajay, who had been released from jail, entered their house to kill Ramadorai in retaliation for having double-crossed Jose and his gang. Ramadorai killed Ajay and convinced Dharmadorai to take the blame for the murder, who was sentenced to seven years imprisonment as a result. The brothers then got Jose and his henchmen also arrested. While Dharmadorai was in jail, Parvathi gave birth to a baby boy.

A few years later, Rajadorai and Ramadorai decided to sell off their father's house and property to "repay the  6 lakhs Dharmadorai had borrowed". When their father opposed their move, the brothers killed him and drove Parvathi and her son out of the house. With nowhere else to go, Parvathi and her son moved to Madras. The small boy was also eventually killed by Ramadorai when he recognised him as the murderer of his grandfather. With no home, her husband imprisoned and her son dead, a grieving Parvathi took up the job of a housemaid in Madras. Soon, Dharmadorai completed his jail sentence. When he found out about Parvathi's plight and how his brothers had betrayed him, he rushed over to the brothers' house and thrashed them mercilessly, only stopping when their wives intervene. Following this, he disowned them and moved to the forest with Parvathi.

In the present day, Jose and his henchmen get released from jail and kidnap Rajadorai and Ramadorai in retaliation for betraying them. On Parvathi's advice, a reluctant Dharmadorai goes to rescue his brothers. He rescues them, following which they seek his forgiveness, which he accepts.

Cast 
Rajinikanth as Dharmadurai
Gautami as Parvathi Dharmadurai
Madhu as Pandidurai Thevar
Charan Raj as Rajadorai
Nizhalgal Ravi as Ramadorai
Vaishnavi as Vaibhavi
Senthil
Dilip
Mohan Raj
Ajay Rathnam as Ajay
V. Aadai Moorthy

Production 
The director Rajasekhar initially started a film titled Kaalam Maaripochu, with Rajinikanth, Manjula, Ramesh Aravind and Senthil among others starring. After some days of filming, the project and story were dropped. The same crew instead decided to remake the 1989 Kannada film Deva, and the project was titled Dharma Durai. The film was already scheduled to release for Pongal 1991, but production was disrupted due to certain circumstances. To avoid disappointing his fans, Rajinikanth worked continuously for 72 hours to ensure the film was completed and released per schedule.

Soundtrack 
The soundtrack was composed by Ilaiyaraaja. The lyrics for all the songs were written by Panchu Arunachalam except "Aanenna Pennena", which was written by Gangai Amaran. Ilaiyaraaja reused "Maasi Masam" as "Enno Ratrulu" in the Telugu film Dharma Kshetram (1992). The song was later remixed by Srikanth Deva in Pandi (2008).

Release and reception 
Dharma Durai was released on 14 January 1991, during Pongal. N. Krishnaswamy The Indian Express wrote that the film "has sequences that hold water" praising Rajinikanth because he "shows split second timing in delivering comic lines in a good part of the film". Sundarji of Kalki reviewed the film more negatively, criticising the writing and calling it strictly for Rajinikanth's fans. On the 100th day celebrations, Rajasekhar died in a car accident, making this his last release. The film ran for over 175 days in theatres.

References

External links 

1990s action drama films
1990s Tamil-language films
1991 films
Films about brothers
Films directed by Rajasekhar (director)
Films scored by Ilaiyaraaja
Films with screenplays by Panchu Arunachalam
Indian action drama films
Indian films about revenge
Tamil remakes of Kannada films